Brécy may refer to the following places in France:

 Brécy, Aisne, a commune in the department of Aisne
 Brécy, Cher, a commune in the department of Cher
 Brécy-Brières, a commune in the department of Ardennes
 Saint-Gabriel-Brécy, a commune in the department of Calvados